The title Serbian Patriarch may refer to:

 primates of the former Serbian Patriarchate of Peć (1346-1766)
 primates of the former Serbian Patriarchate of Sremski Karlovci (1848-1920)
 primates of the modern Serbian Orthodox Church (1920-present)

See also
 List of heads of the Serbian Orthodox Church
 Serbian Patriarchate (disambiguation)
 Patriarchate of Peć (disambiguation)
 Serbian Archbishopric (disambiguation)